Rock and Roll Is Black and Blue is the sixth studio album by Canadian hard rock band Danko Jones. It was released on October 9, 2012.  The song "Just a Beautiful Day" reached No. 10 on the Canadian rock/alternative chart.

Track listing 
 "Terrified" – 3:26
 "Get Up" – 3:09
 "Legs" – 3:37
 "Just a Beautiful Day" – 3:15
 "I Don't Care" – 3:20
 "You Wear Me Down" – 3:55
 "Type of Girl" – 3:46
 "Always Away" – 4:12
 "Conceited" – 3:47
 "Don't Do This" – 3:42
 "The Masochist" – 2:53
 "I Believed in God" – 3:59
 "I Believed in God (Reprise)" – 0:46
 "In Your Arms" – 4:26

Deluxe version 
15. "Crazy in Bed" (bonus Track) – 4:03

Spotify exclusive version 
16. "Whatever Happens" (bonus track) – 3:34

References

External links 
 

2012 albums
Danko Jones albums
Bad Taste Records albums
Albums recorded at Noble Street Studios